Grace Adela Williams Crowley  (pr: as in "slowly") (28 May 1890 – 21 April 1979) was an Australian artist and modernist painter.

Early life and education
Grace Crowley was born in May 1890 in Barraba, New South Wales. She was the fourth child of Henry, a grazier, and Elizabeth (née Bridger). By 1900, her family had relocated to a homestead in Glen Riddle, Barraba, where she spent her time drawing people, cats, dogs, kookaburras, and even her father's prize winning bullock. At about the age of 13 Crowley's parents sent one of her pen and ink drawings to New Idea magazine and she won a prize.

As a child, Crowley received an informal education from the governess of her homestead. When this arrangement finished, Crowley and her sister were sent to a boarding school in Sydney. It was at this time that her Uncle insisted she attend classes by Julian Ashton at The Sydney Art School, now the Julian Ashton Art School.  Once a week she would attend a class with Ashton and practice her drawing skills, this was her first formal education in the arts. When Crowley returned to Glen Riddle her desire to create art had diminished, partly as a result of her family’s expectations of her role in the household and she quickly took on a lot of the household duties. In 1909 Ashton visited Crowley at the family farm and encouraged her artistic practice. In 1915 Crowley became a full time student at The Sydney Art School and from 1918-1923 worked as Ashton’s assistant. During her time at the school Crowley studied alongside; Ralph Balson, John Passmere, Dorrit Black, Herbert Badham, Rah Fizelle, Gerald Lewars, Nancy Hall and John Tilam.  In 1925 Crowley moved to France with her friend and fellow artist Anne Dangar. Crowley studied at the Académie Colarossi and then took private lessons with a Beaux-arts portrait painter Louis Roger. From 1927 to 1929 she was enrolled at L'acadmaine Lhote under André Lhote. Throughout the next few years she travelled throughout Europe and briefly studied under Amédée Ozenfant and Albert Gleizes. She moved back to Sydney in 1930.

Career
On her return to Australia, Crowley was one of the most experienced Modernist artists in Australia, with a sophisticated understanding of Cubism. In 1932 she briefly taught at the Black Modern Art Centre before it was closed down. She then went on to start her own school with Rah Fizelle, which was renamed as the Important Centre for Modern Art and was in existence for five years. After a relationship breakdown between Fizelle and Crowley, the school closed in 1937. Fizelle remained at 215a George Street, Crowley however set up a studio at her apartment at 227 George Street. In 1937 Grace Crowley, Ralph Balson, Margel Hinder, Rah Fizelle and Eleonore Lange began planning a group exhibition which later came into fruition with fellow painters and sculptors, Frank Medworth, Dadsworth and Gerald Lewers in Exhibition 1: paintings and sculptures. The exhibition was opened by HV Evatt in the David Jones’ Art Gallery in August 1939. In the early 1940s she was one of the first Australians to move into pure abstraction.

With other participating artists including Rah Fizelle, Frank Hinder and Eleonore Lange, Balson and Crowley came together in the 1930s as leaders of the second phase of the modern movement in Australian art, developing the earlier ideas of Roland Wakelin, Roy De Maistre and others at the beginning of World War I.

In 1949, Crowley spent a brief period teaching a course in abstract art at East Sydney Technical College.

During this time and throughout the 1950s, Grace Crowley was most productive. Exhibiting regularly from 1944 and 1954 with the Society of Artists and Contemporary Art Society, Crowley also participated in multiple group exhibitions including; Abstract paintings drawings sculpture constructions, David Jones Art Gallery, 1948. Contemporary Art Society- Eleventh Annual Interstate Exhibition, 1949, and Abstract compositions, paintings, sculpture, Macquarie Galleries, 1951. In 1954 with Balson’s retirement impending, Crowley purchased a house in High Hill, Mittagong, in which she resided alongside her 227 George Street Studio. Only two known paintings were created between 1955 and 59, an abandonment of geometric forms occurred in exchange for gestural brushwork. In 1960 Crowley and Balson travelled to galleries in England, France and America. A rapid turn in style occurred during this time of travel, notably in Devon where both Crowley and Balson turned to pouring paint in a similar fashion to Jackson Pollock. In August 1964 Balson died unexpectedly, marking the end of Crowley’s art practice also. Crowley stayed at the High Hill residence until she purchased a unit in Manly.

In honour of the forerunners of the modern abstract movement, in 1966 the Art Gallery of New South Wales held an exhibition which included Crowley and her colleagues such as Balson, Fizelle and Hinder.

Shortly before her 85th birthday, in 1975 the Art Gallery of New South Wales opened its doors to the first retrospective of Crowley, comprising 25 paintings and 12 drawings. Elena Taylor, NGA’s Curator of Australian Painting and Sculpture notes, "Crowley’s long artistic journey over five decades from painter of traditional landscapes to avant-garde abstracts was extraordinary. While Crowley is still best known for her cubist paintings of the 1920s and 1930s, Grace Crowley: being modern includes works that have never before been exhibited and reveals the full extent of Crowley’s contribution to Australian art.".  Her Project 4 Exhibition followed shortly after. In January 1976, Crowley was made a Member of the Order of Australia  for her services to Art.

The National Gallery of Australia held a solo exhibition of her work in December 2006 to May 2007 called Grace Crowley - Being Modern. Crowley is represented by Australian National Gallery, Art Gallery of New South Wales, National Gallery of Victoria.

Death
Crowley died at her home in Manly, New South Wales on 21 April 1979 aged 89. She left a small body of works, 3 of which are held permanently in the Cruther's Collection of Womens Art in the University of Western Australia.

Selected exhibitions
 1930 A Group of Seven, with Dorrit Black, Roy de Maistre, Roland Wakelin, Enid Cambridge, Grace Cossington Smith and Frank Weitzel, Macquarie Galleries, March.
 1932 Solo Exhibition, Modern Art Centre,  Sydney, June.
 1939 Exhibition I: Paintings and Sculptures. David Jone's Art Gallery, Sydney, August.
 1966 Balson Crowley Fizelle Hinder. Art Gallery of New South Wales, May.
 1975 Australian Women Artists, One Hundred Years: 1840 - 1940. Ewing and George Paton Galleries, Melbourne, September. Art Gallery of New South Wales, October. National Gallery of Victoria, January.

Further reading
 
 Symposium papers: Colour in art - revisiting 1919 & R-Balson (2008), Nick Waterlow (Australia) (Curator), Annabel Pegus (Australia) (Curator), Ivan Dougherty Gallery (Australia, estab. 1977), Paddington, Sydney, New South Wales, Australia.
 Grace Crowley: being modern (2006), Elena Taylor (Author), National Gallery of Australia (Australia, estab. 1982), Canberra, Australian Capital Territory, Australia.
 Parallel visions: works from the Australian collection (2002), Barry Pearce (Australia) (Author), Art Gallery of New South Wales (Australia, estab. 1874), Domain, Sydney, New South Wales, Australia.
 Australian art: in the Art Gallery of New South Wales (2000), Barry Pearce (Australia) (Author), Art Gallery of New South Wales (Australia, estab. 1874), Domain, Sydney, New South Wales, Australia.
 Brought to light: Australian Art 1850-1965 (1998), Lynne Seear (Australia) (Editor), Julie Ewington (Australia) (Editor), Queensland Art Gallery (Australia, estab. 1895), South Brisbane, Queensland, Australia.
 The Art Gallery of New South Wales collections (1994), Ewen McDonald (Australia) (Editor), Art Gallery of New South Wales (Australia, estab. 1874), Sydney, New South Wales, Australia.
 Ralph Balson A Retrospective (Jul 1989), Bruce Adams (Author), Heide Park and Art Gallery (Australia, estab. 1980, closed 1992), Bulleen, Victoria, Australia.
 Project 4: Grace Crowley (1975), Daniel Thomas (Curator), Art Gallery of New South Wales (Australia, estab. 1874), Sydney, New South Wales, Australia.

References

External links
 Grace Crowley at the Art Gallery of New South Wales
 Helen Topliss ed, Earth Fire Water Air: Anne Dangar's Letters to Grace Crowley 1930-1951 Review by Jody Fitzhardinge, Curtin University, September 2001
 Dorrit Black's Modern Art Centre (extract) by Sarah Thomas, Art & Australia, Spring 2006.
 Grace Crowely at Australian Art
 Visual Arts - The Encyclopedia of Women and Leadership in Twentieth-Century Australia. Retrieved 7 August 2014.

1890 births
1979 deaths
20th-century Australian painters
20th-century Australian women artists
Australian women painters
Cubist artists
People from New South Wales
19th-century Australian women